Tintange  is a village of Wallonia and a district of the municipality of Fauvillers, located in the province of Luxembourg, Belgium. It is part of the Arelerland.

Tintange is situated close to the national road N4, between the towns of Bastogne and Martelange, and is surrounded by the valleys of a river and two creeks, respectively called Sûre, Surbach and Molscht.

External links 
 
 Historic postcards of Tintange

Former municipalities of Luxembourg (Belgium)
Fauvillers